Khvoshab-e Olya (also Romanized as Khvoshāb-e ‘Olyā and Khowshāb-e ‘Olyā; also known as Khūshāb Bāla, Khūshāb-e Bālā, Khvoshāb-e Bālā, and Khoshab Olya) is a village in Deymkaran Rural District, Salehabad District, Bahar County, Hamadan Province, Iran. At the 2006 census, its population was 598, in 148 families.

References 

Populated places in Bahar County